Kalbimi Koydum (I Placed My Heart...) is the tenth studio album by Turkish singer Gülben Ergen, released on 19 October 2015 by DMC.

Release and content 
Kalbimi Koydum was Ergen's first studio album in 4 years. It was also her first album being published by DMC after she ended her contract with Seyhan Müzik.

Commenting on the album, Ergen said: "We said to ourselves the winner is who puts his heart into what he does and then we set off. Good music is always at the top, and I hope out 5 years of labor shows a permanent success."

Ergen's duet song with Bora Duran, "Kalbimi Koydum", ranked first on iTunes Turkey. The album itself occupied the first position on iTunes Turkey's list upon release.

Track listing

Release history

References 

2015 albums
Turkish-language albums